Demonic Toys 2 (also known as Demonic Toys: Personal Demons) is a 2010 American  horror comedy slasher film written and directed by William Butler and produced by Charles Band. It is a slasher film and is a sequel to Demonic Toys.

A sequel/spin-off, Baby Oopsie was released in 2021.

Plot
Taking place right after the events of Demonic Toys, an unknown stranger with a pair of gloved hands picks up the pieces of the destroyed toys and starts stitching them together. The only toys, the perpetrator could fix correctly were Baby Oopsie Daisy and Jack Attack. The unidentified man puts the toys into a crate, and is handed over a suitcase full of cash by another man, who then leaves with the toys. The man is revealed to be Dr. Lorca with his wife, Lauraline and her stepson, David and a little woman named Lillith, who is a psychic of some sorts. Dr. Lorca's driver, Eric accidentally drops a crate that Dr. Lorca wants brought into the house, revealing the Demonic Toys inside it. It is revealed that Dr. Lorca is still collecting oddity toys. He's arrived because Caitlin called and told him about an oddity toy she found within the castle that's able to move. The castle's current owners seldom come there, meaning they're superstitious of everything that's happened in there. The owners decided to empty and sell it to the italian government to make it a historical landmark and keep it open for the public. Caitlin takes them inside the castle and gives them its history. The doll itself was hand carved out of wood with a mixture of fabric elements. Caitlin opens the box and shows them the doll, Divoletto. Mr. Butterfield examines the toy and claims it is the oldest toy he's ever seen, made possibly in the 14th century. Caitlin shows them how it moves. Just tap a wand on the side of the box a couple of times and then it will come to life. After a while, the toy finally moves. Caitlin believes that there are magnets in the wand and when the box is tapped, it sets off the springs and mechanisms inside of Divoletto. However, Lillith thinks differently. Eric suddenly runs in the room and tells them that their cars are gone. Since everything is closed and have no transportation to get back to Rome, Caitlin suggests that they stay at the castle for the night. Meanwhile, Lillith examines Divoletto to catch a vision of some sorts, and sees a vision of the future where Divoletto's killing them all.

David then smashes Divoletto's head with a shovel, but it's revealed that Divoletto was one of Fiora's personal demons. The demon then sucks Fiora's spirit out of Lillith and brings her through the portal back to hell. The demonic toys then attack them and David cuts their heads off with the shovel, killing them. The next day, David, Caitlin and a spooked out Lillith leave the castle, with the toys staying so no one else can find them, along with the clay vessels containing Fiora's personal demons. The sound of glass shatter is heard, and the painting of Fiora at the castle starts whispering, implying that Fiora's revenge personal demon has been released.

Cast

Release
The film was released on DVD in January 2010.

Reception 
Dread Central reviewed Demonic Toys 2, stating that "While I find myself neither enjoying nor hating the return of the Demonic Toys, it was the film’s irritating, repetitive score that soured me more than anything else."

See also
 List of toys in the Demonic Toys films

References

 The painting of Fiora also appears in Full Moon movie Stuart Gordon's Castle Freak

External links
 

2010 films
2010 horror films
Demonic Toys films
Full Moon Features films
Puppet films
Films scored by Richard Band
American supernatural horror films
American sequel films
Films about sentient toys
Sentient toys in fiction
2010s English-language films
Films directed by William Butler (actor)
2010s American films